Tweng is a municipality in the district of Tamsweg in the state of Salzburg in Austria.

Geography
Tweng lies in the Lungau on the south side of the Radstädter Tauern.

References

Gallery 

Cities and towns in Tamsweg District
Radstadt Tauern